Krishibid Institution Bangladesh is a professional body of professional agriculturalists in Bangladesh.

History
Krishibid Institution Bangladesh traces its origin to the East Pakistan Agriculturalist Association, which was formed in 1970 in Rajshahi University. After the Independence of Bangladesh, the East Pakistan Agriculturalist Association was renamed to Bangladesh Agriculturalist Association. In 1981, it was renamed to Krishibid Institution Bangladesh. The Krishibid Institution, Bangladesh Auditorium is located in Farmgte, Dhaka.

References

1972 establishments in Bangladesh
Organisations based in Dhaka
Trade associations based in Bangladesh
Labour relations in Bangladesh

Agriculture research institutes in Bangladesh